Baron Charles Jean Maurice Lemonnier (12 January 1860 – 11 September 1930) was a Belgian liberal politician and mayor of the City of Brussels.

Charles Lemonnier was a lawyer, mining engineer and as a politician he was alderman ad-interim burgomaster of Brussels. He was also a member of parliament. During World War I he took over as burgomaster of Brussels, while Adolphe Max was held in captivity by the Germans.

Honours 
  Grand Officer in the Order of Leopold (Belgium)  - 1919
  Grand Cross in the Order of the Crown (Belgium) - 1921
  Honorary Knight Grand Cross in the Order of the British Empire (United Kingdom)
  Grand Officer in the Legion of Honour (France)

See also
 List of mayors of the City of Brussels

Notes

References
 Douxchamps, José, Présence nobiliaire au parlement belge (1830–1970). Notes généalogiques, Wépion-Namen, José Douxchamps, 2003, p. 72.
 Van Molle, P., Het Belgisch parlement 1894–1969, Gent, Erasmus, 1969, p. 220.
 Charles Lemonnier

1860 births
1930 deaths
Mayors of the City of Brussels
Barons of Belgium
Belgian Ministers of State
Free University of Brussels (1834–1969) alumni
People from Mons